Freya Ruth Davies (born 27 October 1995) is an English cricketer who plays for Sussex, South East Stars, London Spirit and England as a right-arm fast-medium bowler. She made her Sussex debut in 2010 at the age of fourteen, and played her first match for England in 2019.

Early life
Davies was born on 27 October 1995 in Chichester, West Sussex. When Davies was a young child, her father, and her older brother Jack, both played for the family's local cricket club, Chichester. At the age of 8, Davies decided to join in, and played her first hard-ball game with Jack's under-11 team. She was attracted to fast bowling, because "that seemed like the most fun"; at 10 and 11 she was tall for her age, which also helped. Eventually, she joined the Sussex junior ranks as an 11 year old. 

Davies attended Chichester High School for Girls, Brighton College and the University of Exeter.

Domestic career
In 2010, Davies made her county debut for Sussex, against Middlesex. She took her first wicket a day later in her third match, dismissing the then England captain Charlotte Edwards, thanks in part to a catch by Sarah Taylor that Davies later described as "unbelievable". Davies soon became a regular player in Sussex's side, and was part of their team in three title wins: the 2013 Women's County Championship and the 2012 and 2015 T20 Cups. In the 2019 Women's Twenty20 Cup, Davies was Sussex's leading wicket-taker, with 8 at an average of 14.62.

Davies played every game (36) for Western Storm in the Women's Cricket Super League from its inception in 2016 until its conclusion in 2019, helping her side to two titles, in 2017 and 2019. Davies was the leading wicket-taker in the 2019 competition, with 19 wickets, and the second highest wicket-taker across the four years of the competition, with 37.

In October 2019, Davies was named as one of the first two players signed for London Spirit in The Hundred. She played two matches in the 2020 Rachael Heyhoe Flint Trophy for the South East Stars, but failed to take a wicket. In April 2022, she was bought by the London Spirit for the 2022 season of The Hundred.

International career
In February 2019, although uncapped at the time, Davies was one of twenty-one cricketers to be awarded a central contract by the England and Wales Cricket Board (ECB). Later the same month, she was named in the England squad for their tours to India and Sri Lanka. She made her Women's Twenty20 International cricket (WT20I) debut for England against Sri Lanka on 24 March 2019, and recorded figures of 2/28 from her four overs. She played all three T20Is on the tour, and returned an economy rate of just 4.58.

The following month, she made her Women's One Day International (WODI) debut for England, against Pakistan on 14 December 2019, and finished with figures of 0/19 from her seven overs. She also played two T20Is on the tour, taking three wickets at an average of 14.66.

Davies played two matches in the 2020 Australia women's Tri-Nation Series, and was in England's squad for the 2020 ICC Women's T20 World Cup, but did not play a match.

On 18 June 2020, Davies was named in a squad of 24 players to begin training ahead of international women's fixtures starting in England following the COVID-19 pandemic. She played one T20I in the subsequent series against the West Indies, taking 1/11 from one over in a rain-reduced 5-over match.

In 2021, Davies was named in the squad for England's tour of New Zealand. Davies played five matches on the tour, and was most successful in the T20 series, where she took her T20I best bowling figures of 4/23 in the second match and ended the series as the joint-leading wicket-taker. In June 2021, Davies was named in England's Test squad for their one-off match against India. However, she was later released from the squad, allowing her to play in the 2021 Rachael Heyhoe Flint Trophy ahead of England's one-day matches.

In December 2021, Davies was named in England's squad for their tour to Australia to contest the Women's Ashes. In February 2022, she was named in England's team for the 2022 Women's Cricket World Cup in New Zealand. In June 2022, Davies was named in England's Women's Test squad for their one-off match against South Africa. In July 2022, she was named in England's team for the cricket tournament at the 2022 Commonwealth Games in Birmingham, England.

References

External links

1995 births
Living people
English women cricketers
England women One Day International cricketers
England women Twenty20 International cricketers
Sportspeople from Chichester
Sussex women cricketers
Western Storm cricketers
South East Stars cricketers
London Spirit cricketers
Cricketers at the 2022 Commonwealth Games
Commonwealth Games competitors for England